Christopher Wilkinson (born 5 January 1970) is a former tennis player from England.

Career
Born and bred in Southampton, Chris Wilkinson has achieved much in the world of tennis. But it could have been very different as his first passion was football in which he excelled for Southampton and had trials for Aston Villa and Coventry.
Wilkinson started his winning ways with tennis tournament success as a 10-year-old junior. From there Wilkinson went on to win national and overseas tournaments and represented Great Britain in the World Championships at all junior age groups.

On the main Tour Wilkinson played some of his best tennis at Wimbledon where he reached the 3rd round in Singles on four occasions and made the quarter finals of Doubles.
Wilkinson had the privilege of playing on Centre and No. 1 court on many occasions. He will probably be best remembered for his Centre Court battle in 1993 against Stefan Edberg, in which he broke the champion's serve no less than seven times before faltering on his own and succumbing to defeat in three close sets.
His best win was over Goran Ivanišević in 1993 at Queen's. Wilkinson has recorded many notable wins over several top 20 world ranked players. Wimbledon continues to be a special place for the former British No. 1 and  he is regularly invited to compete in the Gentleman's senior invitational event.

In 1993 Wilkinson achieved his ambition of becoming British No. 1 Singles player. He has represented Great Britain in the Davis Cup and the 1992 Barcelona Olympics. Wilkinson retired from the main tour in 1999 but kept up his competitive play in the following years and in 2005 became the British and world over-35 champion.

Wilkinson is still very much involved with the sport, working with the LTA as a National Performance Coach/captain for the 12 to 16-year-old boys. In February 2018, he was appointed as County Performance Manager for Hampshire and Isle of Wight LTA.

Wilkinson also remains very busy in the media world, including TV commentating for Eurosport, ATP media and ITV4. He also has a regular column with ESPN.

As for playing tennis, Wilkinson is regularly invited to exhibition events where he often plays with some of the all-time greats of the tennis world.

Wilkinson currently resides in Hampshire with his wife Amanda and their two daughters, Alice born in 1998 and Emily born in 2001.

In 1984 he featured in an advert shown in the UK and Ireland for Bisto gravy.

ATP career finals

Doubles: 2 (2 runner-ups)

ATP Challenger and ITF Futures finals

Singles: 8 (3–5)

Doubles: 15 (7–8)

Performance timelines

Singles

Doubles

External links
 
 
 
 

1970 births
Living people
English sports broadcasters
English male tennis players
Olympic tennis players of Great Britain
Sportspeople from Southampton
Tennis commentators
Tennis players at the 1992 Summer Olympics
British male tennis players
Tennis people from Hampshire
People from Rowland's Castle